David Johansson may refer to:

David Johansson (skier) (1926–2005), Swedish cross-country skier
David Johansson (footballer) (born 1982), Swedish football defender
David Johansson (diplomat) (born 1935), Finnish diplomat and ambassador

See also
David Johansen (born 1950), American musician also known by the stage name "Buster Poindexter"
David Monrad Johansen (1888–1970), Norwegian composer
David S. Johanson, a member of the United States International Trade Commission since 2011, and its vice-chairman for a 2016–2018 term